Merret is a surname. Notable people with the surname include:

Christopher Merret (1614/1615–1695), English physician and scientist
Faustine Merret (born 1978), French windsurfer
Merret (born 1994) cute bean, Samo's Snack. But actually belongs to Yunariel.

See also
Merrett
Merrit (disambiguation)